Morton Irwin Weinfeld (born 1949) is a Canadian sociologist, who has conducted studies on Canadian Jewry. He is chair in Canadian ethnic studies and former chairman of the sociology department at McGill University.

Weinfeld was born to Polish Jewish Holocaust survivors and raised in Montreal.

Partial bibliography
 
  With Daniel Elazar.
  With Harold Troper.
  With Desmond Morton.
  Edited with Robert Brym and William Shaffir.
  With John J. Sigal.
  With Harold Troper.
  With William Shaffir and Irwin Cotler.

References

1949 births
Living people
Ethnic studies in Canada
Harvard Graduate School of Education alumni
Harvard University alumni
Jewish Canadian sociologists
Canadian sociologists
McGill University alumni
Academic staff of McGill University
People from Montreal